Hello English is an English language-learning application, which allows users to learn the English language through interactive modules. It functions on a freemium pricing model. The app is available on Android, iOS, Windows and Web.

History 
Hello English was launched in October 2014 by CultureAlley. It is an edtech startup co-founded by Nishant Patni, an alumnus of IIT Bombay and Kellogg School of Management along with Pranshu Patni, an alumnus of NMIMS, back in December 2012. It runs under Jaipur based Intap Labs Private Limited.

Funding 
The platform raised $6.5 million in Series-A funding led by New York-based venture capital firm Tiger Global Management in March, 2015. The other participants included Kae Capital (led by Sasha Mirchandani), and 500 Startups, California, and angel investors - Rajan Anandan and Sunil Kalra.

The platform had previously raised an undisclosed amount of funding from Kae Capital in 2013.

Features 
The application consists of 475 interactive lessons and games associated with reading, writing, speaking, and listening and has gamification mechanics in the app. It has a bilingual dictionary, available in 22 languages.

Awards/Recognition 
 2017: Number #3 Educational app on Google Play Store in India.
 2016: Received the Most Innovative Mobile App for India award from the Internet and Mobile Association of India (IAMAI).
 2016: Best Apps of 2016 in 'Made in India' category by Google Play Store.
 2015: Co-founder of Hello English, Pranshu Patni listed as Forbes 30 under 30 achievers for creating the Hello English app.
 2015: Number #1 Educational app on Google Play store in India.
 2015: According to App Annie, it is the 98th most downloaded app in India on Android phones as of 8 July 2015.
2014: Received the Most Innovative Mobile App for India award from the Internet and Mobile Association of India (IAMAI).

See also
 Computer-assisted language learning
 Language education
 Language pedagogy
 List of flashcard software
 List of language self-study programs

References

External links
 Official website

Language learning software
Indian educational websites
Internet properties established in 2014
2014 establishments in Pennsylvania
Companies based in Rajasthan
IOS software
Android (operating system) software
Universal Windows Platform apps
Multilingual websites
English-language websites
Virtual learning environments
E-learning in India
Distance education institutions based in India
Education companies of India
Online tutoring
2014 establishments in Rajasthan